Frederick Russell Alexander (4 June 1924 – 17 May 1984) was an English cricketer. He was a right-handed batsman and a right-arm medium pace and off-break bowler who played for Middlesex during the 1951 season. He was born in Acton Green and died in Harrow, London.

Alexander represented Middlesex in two County Championship games during the 1951 season, making his debut against Surrey and following this up with a game against Sussex two weeks later. Alexander was a lower-middle order batsman who also played five games for the team in the Minor Counties Championship, but was unable to score enough runs to secure a permanent place in the side.

Alexander also played football as a centre-back, and was on the books of league teams QPR and Charlton Athletic, but never made senior appearances for either. He played for Dartford and Margate in the Kent Football League. Alexander's transfer from Dartford to Charlton Athletic set a record for a non-league club, as he and Riley Cullum were bought for £6,000.

References

1924 births
1984 deaths
English cricketers
Middlesex cricketers
Dartford F.C. players
Margate F.C. players
People from Acton, London
English footballers
Association football central defenders
Kent Football League (1894–1959) players